The Leica S is a digital camera.

References

Digital cameras
Leica S-mount cameras